Yuanzheng is a restartable upper stage developed by the China Academy of Launch Vehicle Technology (CALT) for the Long March rocket family.

The Yuanzheng stage enables the Chinese launch vehicles to deploy payloads directly to high-energy orbits such as medium Earth orbit (MEO) and geosynchronous orbit (GSO). Since the Long March third stage cannot restart, it cannot circularize a GSO or GEO orbit from a geosyncronous transfer orbit (GTO). With its restart capability, Yuanzheng has enabled the deployment of satellite pairs for the BeiDou Navigation Satellite System in MEO and communications satellites in GSO. This eliminates the need for the spacecraft to include a liquid apogee engine or an apogee kick motor.

It uses the storable hypergolic propellants unsymmetrical dimethylhydrazine (UDMH) and dinitrogen tetroxide, and can perform at least two burns within its rated life of 6.5 hours, sufficient to reach the transfer orbit apogee, and perform the circularization burn from there.

Operational variants are designated YZ-1 for Long March 3B and 3C, YZ-1A for Long March 7, YZ-1S for Long March 2C, YZ-2 for Long March 5, and YZ-3 for Long March 2D.

Models

History 
Yuanzheng was presented in a 2013 paper and performed its first mission on 30 May 2015. The debut flight of the Long March 7 in 2016 included an improved version called Yuanzheng-1A that can flexibly deploy multiple payloads into various target orbits. Further variants were later deployed for Long March 5 (YZ-2) in 2016, Long March 2C (YZ-1S) and Long March 2D (YZ-3) in 2018.

Versions 
Currently, there is known to be five versions:
 Yuanzheng-1 (AKA YZ-1): Initial version used with the Long March 3. It could perform missions of 6.5 hours, make two ignitions, perform one spacecraft deployment operation.
 Yuanzheng-1A (AKA YZ-1A): Improved version used with the Long March 7. Improved version with mission life extended to 48hs, capability to perform at least 9 ignitions and ability to do 7 different separation events. It also includes improved thermal control system, guidance algorithms and orbit planning for multiple payload deployment missions. It will be used as the base system for future deep space propulsion stages, space tugs and orbital servicing and debris removal spacecraft.
 Yuanzheng-1S (AKA YZ-1S): Improved version used with the Long March 2C.
 Yuanzheng-2 (AKA YZ-2): New version used with the  Long March 5 upper stage.
 Yuanzheng-3 (AKA YZ-3): New version used with the Long March 2D.

References 

Rocket stages